GeneRec is a generalization of the recirculation algorithm, and approximates Almeida-Pineda recurrent backpropagation. It is used as part of the Leabra algorithm for error-driven learning.

The symmetric, midpoint version of GeneRec is equivalent to the contrastive Hebbian learning algorithm (CHL).

See also
 Leabra
 O'Reilly (1996; Neural Computation)

References

Neuroscience
Machine learning algorithms